"Don't You Wanna Feel" is a song written by James Ash and Natalie Bassingthwaighte for the Rogue Traders' third studio album Better in the Dark. It was released on schedule as the album's first single on 29 September 2007. It was leaked onto P2P networks on 7 September 2007.

At the end of August 2007, it was revealed on the official Rogue Traders forum that the single would soon be available for pre-order via mobile phone. Later, this was confirmed by Sony BMG, and for A$5.55 (including postage), fans could secure their own copy of the single, complete with signatures from band members. Both Natalie Bassingthwaighte & James Ash signed the disc sleeve.

At the APRA Awards of 2009, it won Dance Work of the Year.

Chart performance
The song debuted and peaked at number 10 on the Australian ARIA Singles Chart on 8 October 2007, staying there for two weeks. It was certified gold by the Australian Recording Industry Association for shipping over 35,000 copies.

Music video
The music video for "Don't You Wanna Feel" was filmed in Sydney in July 2007. The video is set in the Rogue Institute for the Gifted, a special hospital where gifted musicians are studied. Described by James Ash as "Grey's Anatomy meets Heroes", the video depicts Ash and Natalie Bassingthwaighte as doctors. Throughout the video they are shown observing patients performing instruments in strange ways. The music video concludes when Ash and Bassingthwaighte briefly disappear into one of the observation rooms, performing with the rest of the group.

Sony BMG announced that the music video would premiere on Network Ten News with Angela Bishop on 11 September 2007. The video, however, was not aired and instead premiered on the band's website the following day.

Track listings
CD single / iTunes EP
 "Don't You Wanna Feel" – 3:16
 "Don't You Wanna Feel" (James Ash vs Kam Denny remix) – 6:15
 "In Love Again" (Live at The Chapel) – 6:28

iTunes EP No. 2
 "Don't You Wanna Feel" – 3:18
 "Don't You Wanna Feel" (James Ash vs Kam Denny remix) – 6:17
 "In Love Again" (Live at The Chapel) – 6:30
 "Don't You Wanna Feel" (Deadmau5 Remix) – 6:13

Charts

Certifications

Release history

Notes

2007 singles
Rogue Traders songs
Songs written by Natalie Bassingthwaighte
Songs written by James Ash
2007 songs
Columbia Records singles